Joseph Henry Delaney (February 5, 1932 – December 21, 1999) was a US lawyer and science fiction writer. He was first published rather late in life, in 1982, and was most associated with Analog Science Fiction and Fact. He would go on to be nominated for the Hugo Award for Best Novella several times and win readers polls from Analog.

Novels
The New Untouchables (1982)
Valentina: Soul in Sapphire (with Marc Stiegler; 1984)
In the Face of My Enemy (1985)
Lords Temporal (1987)

Short stories
Brainchild (1982)
In the Face of My Enemy (1983)
Star-B-Cue (1983)
Chessmen (1984)
The Crystal Ball (with Marc Stiegler; 1984)
Dragon's Tooth (1984)
The Light in the Looking Glass (with Marc Stiegler; 1984)
The Next Logical Step (1984)
The Shaman (1984)
Thus Began the Death of Dreams (1984)
Valentina (with Marc Stiegler; 1984)
Painkillers (1985)

References

The Encyclopedia of Science Fiction, page 315

External links

1932 births
1999 deaths
20th-century American lawyers
20th-century American novelists
20th-century American male writers
20th-century American short story writers
American male novelists
American male short story writers
American science fiction writers